The Park Community School is a coeducational secondary school located in Barnstaple, Devon, England.

History and houses

It was founded in 1910 as Barnstaple Grammar School, and was the first secondary school to be built by Devon County Council, educating the youth of much of North Devon. The school's name was changed to The Park School in 1973 when the school became a comprehensive.
From 2002 to 2003 the school underwent extensive remodelling with a new maths and science building linking the old North and South Buildings, and a new food hall was also built whilst many of the old classrooms were redesigned and refurbished.

Previously a foundation school administered by Devon County Council, in February 2019 The Park Community School converted to academy status. The school is now sponsored by the Tarka Learning Partnership.

The school used to consist of four houses, each of which was named after a prominent person from Devon: Sir Francis Drake, Hugh Fortescue, 4th Earl Fortescue, Charles Kingsley, and Sir Walter Raleigh. In 1999, owing to the number of pupils attending the school, a fifth house, Chichester, named after Barnstaple born Sir Francis Chichester, was created.

Subjects
The school used to specialise in teaching technical subjects, including food, electronics, product design, graphics and textiles, and students were able to take small classes in these subjects.

Notable former pupils
Barnstaple Grammar School

Michael Bowering
Ann Cleeves
Jonathan Hanmer
Nicholas Hooper (1654–1731)
Charles Johnston (priest)
John Johnston (priest)
Thomas Lee (1794–1834)
Gervase Frederick Mathew, naval officer and entomologist
Cuthbert Mayne, martyr
David Shepherd (umpire)
David Spiegelhalter, statistician
David Vine, commentator

References

External links

Secondary schools in Devon
Buildings and structures in Barnstaple
Academies in Devon